Testimony of the Ancients is the third album by the Dutch death metal band Pestilence, released in 1991 on Roadrunner Records. This was their first release with a new lineup, with Tony Choy replacing Martin van Drunen on bass, while guitarist Patrick Mameli filled in for the latter on vocals.

Overview
Following the departure of former bassist/vocalist Martin van Drunen, guitarist Patrick Mameli took over vocal duties. Mameli steered the band towards a more melodic and technical approach, expanding on the death metal sound of its predecessor Consuming Impulse. The resulting concept album, Testimony of the Ancients contrasted brutal death metal riffs with melodic interludes and tackled what John Serba describes as, "strangely philosophical, and oddly compelling, subject matter". After each song on the album, there was an instrumental outro track. This attempt to push the boundaries of death metal, at a time when the scene was saturated with copycat "one track minded" bands, mirrored the efforts of fellow progressive bands Atheist and Death who released Unquestionable Presence and Human respectively in 1991, the same year as Testimony. The album can also be seen as a stepping stone on the way to the following Pestilence album Spheres, which departed still further from traditional death metal and headed towards jazz fusion.

Testimony of the Ancients was reissued, along with Consuming Impulse, on Roadrunner Records' Two from the Vault series.

Track listing

Personnel
Pestilence
Patrick Mameli - guitar, vocals
Patrick Uterwijk - guitar
Tony Choy - bass
Marco Foddis - drums
Additional musicians 
Kent Smith - keyboards

Production
Arranged By Pestilence
Produced By Pestilence & Scott Burns
Recorded, Engineered & Mixed By Scott Burns
Mastered By Eddy Schreyer
Cover art By Dan Seagrave

References

External links
"Testimony Of The Ancients" at discogs

Pestilence (band) albums
1991 albums
Albums with cover art by Dan Seagrave
Roadrunner Records albums
Albums produced by Scott Burns (record producer)